Rangapukur is a village located in Bansihari subdivision of Dakshin Dinajpur district in West Bengal, India.

Location 
Balurghat is the district headquarter of this village. The village code of this village is 311738.

Population 
With about 166 houses this village has a total population of 726 peoples, out of which male population is 384 while female population is 342.

See also 

 Dahuakuri village in Dakshin Dinajpur
 Kalyani village in Dakshin Dinajpur

References 

Villages in Dakshin Dinajpur district